Aspergillopeptidase A may refer to:

 Penicillopepsin, EC 3.4.23.20 
 Rhizopuspepsin, EC 3.4.23.21 
 Endothiapepsin, EC 3.4.23.22
 Mucorpepsin, EC 3.4.23.23
 Candidapepsin, EC 3.4.23.24 
 Saccharopepsin, EC 3.4.23.25
 Rhodotorulapepsin, EC 3.4.23.26
 Physaropepsin, EC 3.4.23.27, now EC 3.4.21.103, physarolisin
 Acrocylindropepsin, EC 3.4.23.28
 Polyporopepsin, EC 3.4.23.29 
 Pycnoporopepsin, EC 3.4.23.30